Jackie Perez is a Canadian television personality and reporter.

Early life and education
Perez was born in Manila, Philippines and raised in Mississauga, Ontario. She graduated from the Media Studies program at the University of Guelph-Humber.

Career
Perez started her career with an internship at The Mississauga News and was a host and reporter at Rogers TV Mississauga's InSauga.com, a show that highlights Mississauga's culture.

In 2011, she joined the Toronto Argonauts as a cheerleader. In 2012, she became captain of the cheer team before becoming an in-game host for the Argonauts.

Perez joined CTV Prince Albert as a video journalist in December 2017. In October 2018, she made the move to CTV Regina to take on the role of On the Go reporter for CTV Morning Live. Every weekday morning she gives a live look at what's happening around the city and neighbouring communities in southern Saskatchewan.

References

Living people
University of Guelph alumni
People from Manila
Filipino emigrants to Canada
Canadian television personalities
Canadian Football League cheerleaders
Toronto Argonauts personnel
CTV Television Network people
Canadian women television journalists
Canadian television reporters and correspondents
People from Mississauga
Year of birth missing (living people)